Miguel López Correa (born April 9, 1990) is a Puerto Rican sprinter. At the 2012 Summer Olympics, he competed in the Men's 100 metres.

Personal bests

Competition record

References

External links

Sports reference biography

1990 births
Living people
Puerto Rican male sprinters
Pan American Games competitors for Puerto Rico
Athletes (track and field) at the 2011 Pan American Games
Olympic track and field athletes of Puerto Rico
Athletes (track and field) at the 2012 Summer Olympics
World Athletics Championships athletes for Puerto Rico
Sportspeople from San Juan, Puerto Rico
Olympic male sprinters